Garth Robert Cole (May 5, 1916 – September 7, 1971) was an American football guard who played four seasons with the New York Giants of the National Football League. He played college football at Trinity University and attended Stamford High School in Stamford, Texas.

References

External links
Just Sports Stats

1916 births
1971 deaths
Players of American football from Texas
American football guards
Trinity Tigers football players
New York Giants players
People from Stamford, Texas